This is a list of people who have served as Custos Rotulorum of Kent.

 Sir John Baker bef. 1544–1558
 Thomas Wotton bef. 1562–1587
 Sir Henry Cobham 1587–1592
 Sir Edward Hoby bef. 1594–1617
 Ludovic Stewart, 2nd Duke of Lennox 1617–1624
 Philip Herbert, 4th Earl of Pembroke 1624–1642
 Robert Sidney, 2nd Earl of Leicester 1642–1646
Interregnum
 Heneage Finch, 3rd Earl of Winchilsea 1660–1688
 Christopher Roper, 5th Baron Teynham 1688–1689
 Heneage Finch, 3rd Earl of Winchilsea 1689
 Henry Sidney, 1st Earl of Romney 1689–1704
 Charles Finch, 4th Earl of Winchilsea 1704–1705
 Lewis Watson, 1st Earl of Rockingham 1705–1724
 Lionel Sackville, 1st Duke of Dorset 1724–1765
For later custodes rotulorum, see Lord Lieutenant of Kent.

References
Institute of Historical Research - Custodes Rotulorum 1544-1646
Institute of Historical Research - Custodes Rotulorum 1660-1828

Kent